Aftab Jehangir is a Pakistani politician who had been a member of the National Assembly of Pakistan from August 2018 till January 2023.

Political career
He was elected to the National Assembly of Pakistan from Constituency NA-252 (Karachi West-V) as a candidate of Pakistan Tehreek-e-Insaf in the 2018 Pakistani general election.

In October 2018, the Sindh Anti-Corruption Establishment initiated an inquiry against Jehangir after he was accused by Rabistan Khan of land grabbing in Taiser Town.

Resignation

In April 2022, he also resigned from the National Assembly seat along with all Tehreek-e-Insaaf members after the Foreign-imposed Regime Change by the United States.

External Link

More Reading
 List of members of the 15th National Assembly of Pakistan
 List of Pakistan Tehreek-e-Insaf elected members (2013–2018)
 No-confidence motion against Imran Khan

References

Living people
Pakistani MNAs 2018–2023
Pakistan Tehreek-e-Insaf politicians
Year of birth missing (living people)